The 1926 All-Eastern football team consists of American football players chosen by various selectors as the best players at each position among the Eastern colleges and universities during the 1926 college football season. 

The 1926 Penn Quakers football team compiled a 7–1–1 record and led all other teams with three players named by at least one selector to the first team. 

Three players received first-team honors on the All-Eastern team and were also consensus first-team picks on the 1926 All-America college football team: end Vic Hanson of Syracuse; tackle Frank Wickhorst of Navy; and guard Harry Connaughton of Georgetown.

Four of the players who received All-Eastern honors in 1926 were later inducted to the College Football Hall of Fame: Hanson of Syracuse; Wickhorst of Navy; tackle Bud Sprague of Army; and guard Herbert Sturhahn of Yale.

All-Eastern selections

Quarterbacks
 R. E. Randall, Brown (AP-1, BDE-1, TJ-1)
 Connor, NYU (BT-1)

Halfbacks
 Charlie Rodgers, Penn (AP-1)
 Frank Kirkleski, Lafayette (AP-1, TJ-1 [fb])
 Wilson, Army (BDE-1, BT-1, TJ-1)
 Wilson, Lafayette (BDE-1, BT-1)
 Hamilton, Navy (TJ-1)

Fullbacks
 Bill Amos, Washington & Jefferson (AP-1, BT-1)
 Rogers, Penn (BDE-1)

Ends
 Vic Hanson, Syracuse (AP-1, BDE-1, BT-1, TJ-1)
 Hal Broda, Brown (AP-1, BDE-1, BT-1, TJ-1)

Tackles
 Frank Wickhorst, Navy (AP-1, BDE-1, BT-1, TJ-1)
 Bud Sprague, Army (AP-1, BDE-1)
 Eddy, Navy (BT-1)
 Lloyd Yoder, Carnegie Tech (TJ-1)

Guards
 Harry Connaughton, Georgetown (AP-1, BDE-1, BT-1, TJ-1)
 Emerson Carey, Cornell (AP-1)
 Herbert Sturhahn, Yale (BDE-1, TJ-1)
 Schmidt, Army (BT-1)

Centers
 John Butler, Penn (AP-1, BDE-1, TJ-1)
 Daly, Army (BT-1)

Key
 AP = Associated Press
 BDE = Brooklyn Daily Eagle
 BT = The Brooklyn Daily Times
 TJ = Tad Jones, head coach of Yale

See also
 1926 College Football All-America Team

References

All-Eastern
All-Eastern college football teams